Relations between Serbia and Brazil have been very strong and well built since 1946 when relations were established between the Socialist Federal Republic of Yugoslavia and Brazil. Brazil does not recognize Kosovo as an independent state and has announced it has no plans to do so without an agreement with Serbia.

Political relations 

Then Minister of Foreign Affairs Vuk Jeremić visited Brazil in April 2012. Then Minister of Foreign Affairs V. Jeremic previously visited Brazil in March 2008 in order to gain Brazilian support against Kosovo independence. 
Then Minister of Foreign Affairs of Brazil Celso Amorim visited Serbia in June 2010.

Economic relations 
Brazil is Serbia's major trading partner in Latin America. Export in 2011 amounted to EUR 4.3 million and import to 69.7 million. 
Delegation of Brazilian construction company AG-ZAGOPE visited Serbia in February 2012 to learn about the possibilities of investing in infrastructure projects. 
Brazilian-Serbian Chamber of Commerce was established in Rio de Janeiro in 2011.

Brazilian stance on Kosovo Independence 
In February 2008, the Brazilian government reaffirmed its belief that a peaceful solution for the issue of Kosovo must continue to be sought through dialogue and negotiation, under the auspices of the UN and the legal framework of UNSCR 1244. In his recent declarations, the Foreign Minister, Celso Amorim, defended that Brazil should await a UNSC decision before defining its official position on the matter of Kosovo's independence.In September 2009, Ambassador of Brazil to Serbia Dante Coelho de Lima said that "Our fundamental position is that we respect Serbia's territorial integrity. We supported Security Council resolution 1244, under which Kosovo is a part of Serbia. We also think that the principle of self-determination should not run counter to respect for international law". In a 4 December 2009 hearing at the ICJ, the Brazilian delegation said that the unilateral declaration of independence ignored not only the authority of the UNSC, but also the principle of protecting the territorial integrity of states. There is no basis to justify the unilateral declaration of independence in the UNSC resolution 1244 because it predicted a solution agreed by both parties. Since such an agreement was not reached, the Kosovo dispute can be decided only by the UNSC.

See also 
 Dejan Petkovic
 Brazil–Yugoslavia relations

Notes

External links 
 Brazilian Embassy in Serbia
 Serbian Embassy in Brazil
 Bilateral relations between Brazil and Serbia

 
Serbia
Bilateral relations of Serbia